It's a Great, Great World is a Singapore film directed by Kelvin Tong. It is set in the Great World Amusement Park and was released in Singapore cinemas on 27 January 2011. The film features an ensemble cast of local singers, established MediaCorp artistes, a number of celebrities from Hong Kong and Taiwan and getai group "Babes in the City". A noted feature of the film is the heavy use of common Chinese dialects and many actors had dialogues in dialects they were not familiar with.

Plot
It's A Great Great World is set in Singapore's legendary amusement park named Great World, which was also known to locals by its Hokkien name 'Tua Seh Kai'. Spanning from the 1940s to the present day, the film presents four tales centred on attractions within these once famous walls.

At present time, Ah Min finds four old pictures in her mother's photography studio and seeks out her mother's old friend Goh Ah Beng, who tells her the stories behind these photographs. These four stories include:

 A clown on a quest to have his photo taken with English movie star Elizabeth Taylor and tells his experience to his ageing mother.
 The tale of a carnival shooting gallery operator who experiences her first teenage love with a Malaysian medicinal oil seller's son.
 A washed up diva of the Flamingo Nightclub who used to sing for her lost love, and rediscovers true support by her audience and her manager.
 A lok-lok seller who narrates the story of his wedding dinner with his mute wife the night the Japanese invaded Singapore during World War II.

Interwoven into the film are stories of a multitude of characters that lived, worked, played, sang danced and even fell in love in Great World.

Cast

Yvonne Lim as Tan Ah Huay
Ben Yeo as Ah Siong
Olivia Ong as Ah Min
Nancy Sit as Mrs Tan
Lin Ruping as Ah Beng's neighbour
Chew Chor Meng as Goh Ah Beng
Henry Thia as Ah Boo
Lai Meng as Ah Boo's mother
Chen Tianwen as a Bellboy
Tay Yin Yin as Ang Moh
Sam Tseng as Tiger
Gurmit Singh as a Security Guard
Joanne Peh as Mei Juan
John Cheng as Yeo, an oil seller
Zhang Zhenhuan as Ah Leong, Yeo's son
Justin Ang as an Ah Beng
Ng Hui as Ah Ting
Zheng Geping as ghost train ride operator
Xiang Yun as Rose
Paige Chua as Mu Dan
Babes in the City
Huang Wenyong as Peter
Guo Liang as Henry
Chen Shucheng as Towkay Lim
Apple Hong as Lim Bee Lian
Bryan Wong as Ah Kiang
Zhang Yaodong as Ah Dong
Marcus Chin as Ah Chuen (head chef)
Kym Ng as Molly
Ix Shen as Delivery Man
Dennis Chew as Aunty Lucy

Minor cast
Kimberly Chia as Ah Luan
Benjamin Heng as Ah Ting's boyfriend
Kelly Schuster as Elizabeth Taylor
Vincent Tee as Towkay at Nightclub
Ken Kwek as Kicthen Helper
Emma Yong as Mother at Photo Studio

Historical References
Televised broadcast of Lee Kuan Yew's emotional speech after Singapore's separation from Malaya on 9 August 1965
During the wedding banquet towards the end, Aunty Lucy runs to the restaurant kitchen to warn Ah Chuen and the others that the Japanese are bombing Singapore. With the air raids going on, the kitchen staff reminisce and have one last dinner together knowing that this may be their last as colleagues and friends. After that bombing of Keppel Harbour on 8 December 1941, Singapore fell to the Japanese just months later in February 1942.
In the nightclub scenes, Rose is frequently asked by guests to perform "Rose, Rose, I Love You", which was a popular song written by patriotic Chinese songwriter Chen Gexin during World War II.

Variety shows
There are two variety shows that relate to the movie. The first show was "Amazing Great World" (精彩大世界) which was broadcast on 24 January 2011 on Mediacorp Channel U and another was "Great World Once More" (情迷大世界) which was broadcast on 27 January 2011 on Mediacorp Channel 8.

Box office takings

As at 21 February 2011, the movie has earned more than S$2 million at the Singapore box office and attained viewership of 250,000.

Television broadcast
The movie was telecast on Mei Ah Movies Channel in late 2011. In 2013, Channel 8 broadcast the movie as the Day 1 movie during Chinese New Year with dubbing. Chinese dialects were dubbed except for Aunty Lucy's Shanghainese dialect. On 8 Jan 2019 and 5 May 2020, it was shown on Channel 5 in its original languages.

See also
 Great World Amusement Park

References

External links
 

2011 films
Singaporean comedy films
2010s English-language films